Cotino or Cotina may refer to:

 Cotino (community), a planned Storyliving by Disney community in Rancho Mirage, California
 Juan Cotino (1950 – 2020), a Spanish entrepreneur and politician
 Ćehotina, or Ćotina, a river in Montenegro and Bosnia and Herzegovina

See also
 Contino, an Italian surname
 Cortina (disambiguation)
 Cortino, a town in Italy
 Cotinus, a genus of shrub